Aspidiophorus is a genus of gastrotrichs belonging to the family Chaetonotidae.

The species of this genus are found in Europe, India and America.

Species:

Aspidiophorus aster 
Aspidiophorus bibulbosus 
Aspidiophorus bisquamosus

References

Gastrotricha